The Les Trois Rivières is a river of Haiti.  Its source is in the Massif du Nord (Northern Massif). It then passes through the cities of Plaisance and Pilate.

The river then runs to Port-de-Paix and flows on the outskirts of the port city between the communities of Red Wood and Paulin, facing Tortuga. Finally it flows into the Atlantic Ocean just after crossing the Port-de-Paix airport.

See also
List of rivers of Haiti

References
GEOnet Names Server

Rivers of Haiti